The Chechako is a 1914 American drama silent film directed by Hobart Bosworth, starring Jack Conway, Myrtle Stedman, Joe Ray and Gordon Sackville. It is based on the 1912 novel Smoke Bellew by Jack London. The film was released on November 23, 1914, by Paramount Pictures.

Cast 
Jack Conway as Smoke Bellew
Myrtle Stedman as Joy Gastell
Joe Ray as Shorty
Gordon Sackville as Big Olof

References

External links 
 

1914 films
1910s English-language films
Silent American drama films
1914 drama films
Films based on works by Jack London
Paramount Pictures films
American black-and-white films
American silent feature films
1910s American films